Li Hui (born March 25, 1985 in Guangxi) is a female Chinese freestyle wrestler who competed at the 2004 Summer Olympics.

She finished ninth in the 48 kg freestyle competition.

External links
profile 
profile

1985 births
Living people
Olympic wrestlers of China
Chinese female sport wrestlers
Sportspeople from Guangxi
Wrestlers at the 2004 Summer Olympics
World Wrestling Championships medalists
21st-century Chinese women